Intelsat II was a series of four communications satellites operated by Intelsat which were launched in 1966 and 1967. Built by the Hughes Aircraft Company, the Intelsat II series was a follow-up to the Intelsat I series, of which only one satellite was launched.

Intelsat II spacecraft were based on the HS-303A satellite bus, which was cylindrical in shape and spin-stabilised. They were equipped with an SVM-1 apogee motor to circularise their orbits following launch atop Delta E1 carrier rockets. All four satellites were launched from Launch Complex 17B at the Cape Kennedy Air Station.

Intelsat II spacecraft were designed to be operated in geostationary orbit; however the first satellite's apogee motor malfunctioned leaving it in a lower than planned orbit. It was able to perform a limited communications mission, however the other three spacecraft successfully achieved geostationary orbit. Each satellite carried two transponders, powered by solar cells mounted on the body of the spacecraft, which generated 85 watts of power.

Operations
Intelsat II F-1 provided a transpacific communications link for 240 telephone channels or two television channels. Provision was made for 180 hours of telecasting per year (an average of 30 minutes per day) via the satellite.

A 50-minute programme was relayed between Tokyo and Washington, D.C. via Intelsat II F-1 on 27 January 1967. It was the first newscast and the first colour programme to be telecast across the Pacific. Japan's Fuji Television used the satellite to present direct telecasts of the world featherweight boxing title match between Vicente Saldivar and Mitsunori Seki from Mexico City on 29 January. It was the first live transmission of a sport event across the Pacific. Stars and Stripes reported that the pictures were clear.

Satellites

References

Intelsat satellites
Intelsat 02